Mona Walter (born 1973) is a Swedish activist and social commentator. She was born in Mogadishu, Somalia and moved to Sweden as a refugee in 1994. 

Raised Muslim, Walter converted to Christianity and published writings critical of Islam via her social media accounts and in press articles. Her opinions on the threat she believes Islam poses to the Western world have caused controversy. Her analyses of Islam have been considered "anti-Muslim, Islamophobic, or racist in nature" by both Muslims and non-Muslims. In August 2015, Walter and a camera team from SVT news programme Aktuellt were attacked when they walked through the Stockholm district of Rinkeby. Eggs were thrown at the broadcaster's car. 

She has supported the Eurabia theory, saying that she has heard imams talk about islamising Sweden through child-births and immigration, and has held speeches for organisations such as For Frihed (formerly Pegida Denmark), Stop Islamisation of Norway, and with connections to the Sweden Democrats.

See also
 Ayaan Hirsi Ali

References

Living people
1973 births
Converts to Christianity from Islam
Swedish Christians
Swedish former Muslims
Swedish people of Somali descent
Swedish political writers
Swedish women non-fiction writers
Former Muslim critics of Islam
Christian critics of Islam
People from Mogadishu
Somalian activists
Somalian emigrants to Sweden
Somali Christians
Somalian former Muslims
Somalian refugees
Anti-Islam sentiment in Sweden
Counter-jihad activists